HummingBad is Android malware, discovered by Check Point in February 2016.

In July 2016, researchers from security firm Check Point Software said the malware installs more than 50,000 fraudulent apps each day, displays 20 million malicious advertisements, and generates more than $300,000 per month in revenue. The research pointed out the Yingmob group, previously accused of being responsible for the Yispecter iOS malware, as responsible for the attack.

Lookout claimed the HummingBad malware was also a part of the Shedun family, however, these claims were refuted.

The most infected region was Asia which included China, India, Philippines, Indonesia and Turkey as the top countries.

See also

References

Spyware
Cybercrime in India